Hamming graphs are a special class of graphs named after Richard Hamming and used in several branches of mathematics (graph theory) and computer science. Let  be a set of  elements and  a positive integer. Two vertices are adjacent if they differ in precisely one coordinate; that is, if their Hamming distance is one. The Hamming graph  is, equivalently, the Cartesian product of  complete graphs .

In some cases, Hamming graphs may be considered more generally as the Cartesian products of complete graphs that may be of varying sizes. Unlike the Hamming graphs , the graphs in this more general class are not necessarily distance-regular, but they continue to be regular and vertex-transitive.

Special cases

, which is the generalized quadrangle 
, which is the complete graph 
, which is the lattice graph  and also the rook's graph
, which is the singleton graph 
, which is the hypercube graph . Hamiltonian paths in these graphs form Gray codes.

Applications
The Hamming graphs are interesting in connection with error-correcting codes and association schemes, to name two areas. They have also been considered as a communications network topology in distributed computing.

Computational complexity
It is possible in linear time to test whether a graph is a Hamming graph, and in the case that it is, find a labeling of it with tuples that realizes it as a Hamming graph.

References

External links

Parametric families of graphs
Regular graphs